Salahlı is a village and municipality in the Zardab District of Azerbaijan. It has a population of 598.

References 

Populated places in Zardab District